Charles Nicholson Jewel Oliver  (24 April 1848 – 14 June 1920) was a first-class cricketer and public servant in Australia.

Born in Hobart, Tasmania, Australia, Oliver entered the New South Wales Civil Service, and was appointed Under-Secretary for Lands in November 1880. He then became one of the Commissioners of Railways under the new non-political system of control.

Oliver played three games of cricket for New South Wales between 1865 and 1873.

See also
 List of New South Wales representative cricketers

References

1848 births
1920 deaths
New South Wales cricketers
Australian cricketers
Cricketers from Hobart
Australian Companions of the Order of St Michael and St George